Edward George "Stanky" Stankiewicz (November 30, 1929 – September 12, 2019) was a Canadian professional ice hockey player. He played 6 games in the National Hockey League games with the Detroit Red Wings between 1954 and 1955. The rest of his career, which lasted from 1951 to 1965, was spent in the minor leagues. He was the brother of Myron Stankiewicz, a pro hockey left winger who also played in the NHL. He died at the age of 89 in 2019.

Career statistics

Regular season and playoffs

References

External links
 

1929 births
2019 deaths
Canadian ice hockey right wingers
Detroit Red Wings players
Edmonton Flyers (WHL) players
Hershey Bears players
Ice hockey people from Ontario
Long Island Ducks (ice hockey) players
Los Angeles Blades (WHL) players
Ontario Hockey Association Senior A League (1890–1979) players
St. Louis Flyers players
Seattle Totems (WHL) players
Sherbrooke Saints players
Spokane Comets players
Sportspeople from Kitchener, Ontario
Sudbury Wolves (EPHL) players
Toronto Marlboros players
Windsor Spitfires players